Phyllis Quek (born 23 August 1972) is a Malaysian model, actress, and singer. 

She was prominently a full-time Mediacorp artist from 1995 to 2001, and was ranked by local media as the 'Fourth Ah Jie' for being the fourth most prominent actress in Singapore's Chinese-language entertainment industry of that time after Zoe Tay, Fann Wong and Ann Kok. Phyllis is best known for her lead roles in the movie 2000AD co-starring Aaron Kwok, and as 'Bai Mudan' in the popular TV drama Legends Of The Eight Immortals.

She left Mediacorp after her contract expired but continues to film on an ad-hoc basis and is currently managed under Hype Records.

Career
In 1995, Quek participated in Mediacorp's Star Search and was placed three in the talent show. She was subsequently cast in Beyond Dawn (女子监狱) for which she was awarded the Best Newcomer Award at MediaCorp's Star Awards in 1996.

In 2000, Quek landed a lead role besides  Hong Kong actors Aaron Kwok and Daniel Wu in a joint collaboration movie, 2000 AD. Through this action film, she garnered a reputation in the Asian media industry as noted to have a high potential in local book Singapore Cinema by Raphaël Millet. She subsequently followed this up with a supporting role as a policewoman in another Raintree Pictures film, The Tree.

Her recording of the theme song of her earlier drama, The Other Parent (妈妈先生) and Mind Games (危险人物) marked the start of her career in singing. She then released her debut album, Phyllis, under Hype Records which contained primarily dance tunes and singles from the soundtrack of The Tree and Beyond The Axis Of Truth (法医X档案). To promote her album, Phyllis guest starred in a Channel 5's crime drama series Heartlanders 2 where she played a stalked actress. That particular episode featured her song, 不知不觉, three times and was a radio hit along with her other single, Freedom. However, the album did not mark the start of a longstanding music career for Phyllis and it was to remain her first and only album.

Quek's contract with Mediacorp expired in 2001 and she signed with Hype Records Artiste Networks. She made her debut in Taiwan headlining the lead role in an idol drama titled My Fair Lady (丑女大翻身), in which she donned fatsuits and prosthetics in order to play a heavy-set and undesired girl.

In 2009, Quek gained some recognition for her performance in Perfect Cut II (一切完美2) and was soon cast alongside Christopher Lee as the female lead to star in new movie, Kidnapper, which was scheduled for a 2010 release. As of 2011, Phyllis has starred in more than 40 local and overseas production dramas and 6 movies.

Endorsement
Quek's first huge endorsement deal was for Japan's Bigen Prominous hair dye in 2001. Her Bigen Prominous advertisement could still be seen in 2006 when Bigen sponsored Project Superstar 2. In December 2003, she was signed by Marie France Bodyline to be their spokesperson.

Personal life 
Quek married Australian businessman David Cox in December 2012 and held a wedding dinner on 23 June 2013.

Filmography

Film

Television

Hosting
2009: Fashion Asia 亚洲时尚风 (Seoul)
2010: Citispa Beauty Perfection 2010 Citispa完美大挑战2010

Albums

Accolades

References

External links

 PhyllisQuek.com

Living people
Singaporean Buddhists
Singaporean television actresses
1972 births
Singaporean film actresses
Malaysian people of Chinese descent
Singaporean people of Teochew descent
Malaysian emigrants to Singapore
20th-century Singaporean actresses
21st-century Singaporean actresses